Nelson Ferreira is a sound editor. He is known for his work on the films The Shape of Water for which he was nominated with Nathan Robitaille for Academy Award for Best Sound Editing at the 90th Academy Awards, and The Breadwinner, for which he won the Canadian Screen Award for Best Sound Editing at the 6th Canadian Screen Awards.

References

External links

Canadian sound editors
Living people
Year of birth missing (living people)
Best Sound Editing Genie and Canadian Screen Award winners
Alumni of the London Film School
Canadian people of Portuguese descent